Sinclair Smith (born 27 September 1991) is a Bermudian cricketer. In August 2019, he was named in Bermuda's squad for the Regional Finals of the 2018–19 ICC T20 World Cup Americas Qualifier tournament. He made his Twenty20 International (T20I) debut for Bermuda against the United States on 22 August 2019. In September 2019, he was named in Bermuda's squad for the 2019 ICC T20 World Cup Qualifier tournament in the United Arab Emirates. In November 2019, he was named in Bermuda's squad for the Cricket World Cup Challenge League B tournament in Oman. He made his List A debut, for Bermuda against Hong Kong, on 3 December 2019.

References

External links
 

1991 births
Living people
Bermudian cricketers
Bermuda Twenty20 International cricketers
Place of birth missing (living people)